Turbo is the name of two superheroes appearing in American comic books published by Marvel Comics. Michiko "Mickey" Musashi debuted in New Warriors #28 (Oct 1992) and her ally Michael "Mike" Jeffries in New Warriors #33.

Fictional character biography

The Torpedo armor
The Torpedo armor was a creation of the Dire Wraiths, their attempt to counter the cybernetic armor of the Spaceknights. They employed a human scientist to develop it, combining both Wraith and human technology. It had collapsible turbines mounted around the wrists and ankles, allowing the user to fly and fire powerful blasts of air. Upon discovering that the suit was going to be used for criminal purposes, its inventor stole it but died while escaping, and he gave it to the first person he stumbled onto, a man called Brock Jones, who used it to battle crime as the superhero the Torpedo.

However, Jones eventually decided to hide himself and his family from the people seeking the armor, and went to live in the town of Clairton, West Virginia, where he encountered Rom the Spaceknight and learned about the Wraiths. Jones agreed to help Rom protect the town from the Wraiths, and Rom altered the costume so its lenses would allow the user to see a Dire Wraith's true form.

Jones was eventually found and killed by the Wraiths. Some of Jones' effects were passed on to his relative Phillip Jeffries, whose son Michael found the armor and gave it to his friend Michiko so she could use it as a Halloween costume. When Michiko donned the armor, it began broadcasting on a wavelength that allowed human scientists from the lab that developed the armor to track it and they attacked Michiko and Mike at a college costume party, where Michiko discovered the suit's abilities and fought off her attackers.

The New Warriors
Mickey and Mike began sharing the armor, Mike wishing to be a superhero, while Mickey used it to travel the world. Although she considered heroism as a "ridiculous calling", Mickey did not wish to see innocent people hurt when she could have prevented it. This is one of the reasons which got her mixed up with the New Warriors: after a gang of weapon smugglers under the command of the mercenary Sea Urchin involved an innocent in their dealings, she set out to stop them and ran into the team, who were also tailing the criminals. Mickey helped the Warriors to bring them down, capturing the Sea Urchin.

Mike encountered the Warriors as Turbo when Darkling put Manhattan under siege with the energies of the Darkforce Dimension, and the two Turbos were attacked by the Air Force when they trained with Nova. Mickey became a reserve Warrior, helping rescue the team twice alongside other back-up heroes, before being offered a full-time membership by the team. Mickey continued to share the armor with Mike, but often had to borrow it for missions with the Warriors.

On one mission, the Warriors fought Volx, the queen of the Dire Wraiths, who recognized the Torpedo armor and desired it for the power-boost it would give her. She tracked the armor to Mike and killed him, absorbing his memories. Posing as Mike, she tricked the Warriors into giving her the armor, which she used in a plot to depower Earth's superhuman population, before she was ultimately killed by Night Thrasher. Mickey pledged to be the sort of hero that Mike wanted to be in order to honor him.

Mickey later met and fell in love with a young man named Dalton Beck, who turned out to be Firestrike, a member of the armored criminal team Heavy Mettle. When the Warriors clashed with Heavy Mettle, Firestrike turned on his allies and employer to protect Turbo. Beck was subsequently put in the Federal Witness Protection Program, preventing the two of them from continuing their relationship.

Excelsior (Loners)
Deciding that she would do more good with her education in journalism than adventuring, Mickey retired the Torpedo armor. With the help of Phil Urich, she got a job at the Los Angeles Times newspaper (though she would later quit this job to relocate to New York for reasons unexplained). She founded the group called Excelsior, a support group for retired teenage superheroes; their lives were briefly the focus of the short-lived Loners miniseries.

Within the first issue of Loners; Mickey was talking with Phil regarding Julie Power's recent lapse in using her flying powers.  And in the second issue, Mickey was going on a date with Chris Powell after their latest support group meeting.

Within the third issue; Mickey learns about Chris, Mattie and Johnny's involvement about the MGH Ring and the events leading to where Julie was stabbed by Hollow (originally known as Penance from Generation X). Mickey also prevented Hollow's recapture by the group responsible for her imprisonment by talking to their leader - a CEO named Fuyumi Fujiwaka - in she and Mickey's 'native' Japanese language - though Mickey is an American citizen by birth and why she would refer to the Japanese language as her 'native' tongue is not addressed. The fourth issue has Mickey talking with Chris about her concerns with Mattie within the support group, as well as making up for the recent tensions between them afterwards.

Within the fifth issue, Mickey was almost strangled by Nekra when she was saved by a mysterious girl who called herself "Namie". Although she was terrified of dying (since she was not wearing the Turbo suit at the time), Mickey was also angered by the facts that Julie revealed the truth that she was not a registered hero and that Chris refused to remove the Darkhawk amulet from himself. She was also surprised to learn that Phil harbored feelings for her and witnessing his attack on Chris, in which he grabbed the amulet and transformed into an alternate version of Darkhawk.

Alongside Julie and the other members of the Loners, Mickey is eventually inducted into the Avengers Academy by Hawkeye after the school moves into the former headquarters of the West Coast Avengers.

Powers and abilities
Mickey Mushashi and Mike Jeffries are both normal humans with no superhuman powers. As Turbo, they both wear a helmet and battle suit previously worn by the Torpedo, and invented by the second Torpedo, Michael Stivak, employing both Earth and Dire Wraith technology.

The Torpedo battle suit is commanded via cybernetic circuitry built into the cowl/headpiece and bonds to its wearer allowing for greater degrees of control depending on the wearer's individual body chemistry compatibility and skill in manipulating the cybernetic bond, determined by the degree to which his or her brain pattern interacts with its technology. Brock Jones, the suit's first heroic user and the third Torpedo, had a sufficient degree of compatibility and skill to access most functions of the suit. Mickey, however, possesses a far greater natural compatibility and this, combined with her greater length of time using the suit, has enabled her to access functions that Brock could not, such as the suit's limited ability to reconfigure itself cosmetically according to the wearer's wishes. The helmet and suit are both useless without one another.

The Torpedo battle suit allows Mickey to fly at speeds up to, and including, supersonic levels; the exact top speed of the armor has yet to be classified. While in flight, the suit generates a low-level force field to protect her from the adverse physical stress of moving at such speeds; it also provides a great deal of durability for combat applications, and can disperse radiation directed against it.

Using the small nuclear-powered turbines built into the gauntlets and boots of the suit, Mickey is able to project a pulsed concussive force blast nicknamed a "Turbo Punch" which is essentially a jet-powered punch, enabling her to strike opponents or objects with a tremendous amount of force. Using a dual-fisted double Turbo Punch delivers force equal to a full-powered punch from a superhuman with Class 100 strength. The wearer can regulate these hyper-punches so as to strike a person without causing serious injury. The wearer can also use these turbines to create blasts of high-speed air, projecting both wide wind gusts and narrow gusts and simulating concussive force.

Assisted by the power of the turbo jets, the suit is capable of providing the wearer with superhuman strength, as well. The level of superhuman strength conferred is again based on the wearer's compatibility with the suit and familiarity with its functions. Brock Jones was capable of lifting (pressing) approximately 1 ton; Mickey is able to optimally lift (press) 20 tons.

Built into the suit's visor is a device able to detect Dire Wraiths (a divergent branch of the Skrulls), no matter what form they take, that was given to Brock Jones by Rom the Spaceknight in order to better protect the town of Clairton, West Virginia during the Wraiths' attempted conquest of the Earth. It is possible that it may be able to detect Skrulls, as well.

Other versions

House of M
Mickey appears as a member of the Wolfpack, along with Speedball, Rage, Zero-G, Lightspeed and Darkhawk.

References

External links
http://marvel.com/universe/Turbo_%28Michiko_Musashi%29

Marvel Comics female superheroes
Marvel Comics superheroes